Dogg After Dark is a short-lived American variety show starring rapper Snoop Dogg on MTV. The series debuted on February 17, 2009 and features celebrity interviews, sketch-comedy segments and musical performances by Snoop's own in-house band, the "Snoopadelics."  Dogg After Dark takes place on location at Kress, a Los Angeles club on Hollywood Boulevard.

Episodes

References 

2000s American variety television series
2009 American television series debuts
2009 American television series endings
MTV original programming